Burtia is a genus of moths in the subfamily Arctiinae. The genus was erected by Augustus Radcliffe Grote in 1866.

Species
Burtia cruenta (Herrich-Schäffer, 1866) Cuba
Burtia rubella Grote, 1866 Cuba
Burtia rubridiscalis (Gaede, 1926) Jamaica

References

Arctiinae